Iñaki Quintana (born May 25, 1987, in Mexico City) is a former Mexican professional footballer who last played for Oaxaca  of Ascenso MX.

See also
Football in Mexico

References

External links

Living people
1987 births
Liga MX players
Footballers from Mexico City
Mexican footballers
Association footballers not categorized by position
21st-century Mexican people